William Thomson (3 January 1895–unknown) was a Scottish footballer who played in the Football League for Bristol Rovers and Leicester City.

References

1895 births

20th-century deaths
Year of death missing
Place of death missing
Scottish footballers
Footballers from Glasgow
Parkhead
Association football wing halves
Scottish Football League players
Scottish Junior Football Association players
English Football League players
Blantyre Victoria F.C. players
Parkhead F.C. players
Clyde F.C. players
Leicester City F.C. players
Arthurlie F.C. players
Kilsyth Rangers F.C. players
Johnstone F.C. players
Bristol Rovers F.C. players